In statistics, a proxy or proxy variable is a variable that is not in itself directly relevant, but that serves in place of an unobservable or immeasurable variable. In order for a variable to be a good proxy, it must have a close correlation, not necessarily linear, with the variable of interest. This correlation might be either positive or negative.

Proxy variable must relate to an unobserved variable, must correlate with disturbance, and must not correlate with regressors once the disturbance is controlled for.

Examples
In social sciences, proxy measurements are often required to stand in for variables that cannot be directly measured. This process of standing in is also known as operationalization.  Per-capita gross domestic product (GDP) is often used as a proxy for measures of standard of living or quality of life.  Montgomery et al. examine several proxies used, and point out limitations with each, stating "In poor countries, no single empirical measure can be expected to display all of the facets of the concept of income. Our judgment is that consumption per adult is the best measure among those collected in cross-sectional surveys."

Likewise, country of origin or birthplace might be used as a proxy for race, or vice versa.

Frost lists several examples of proxy variables: Widths of tree rings: proxy for historical environmental conditions; Per-capita GDP: proxy for	quality of life; body mass index (BMI): proxy for true body fat percentage; years of education and/or GPA: proxy for
cognitive ability; satellite images of ocean surface color: proxy for depth that light penetrates into the ocean over large areas; changes in height over a fixed time: proxy for
hormone levels in blood.

See also
 Instrumental variable
 Latent variable
 Operationalization
 Proxy (climate)

References

 
 
 

Statistical analysis